Salena may refer to:

 Salena, Nepal, village development committee
 Salena Jones (born 1930 or 1944), American jazz and cabaret singer
 Salena Godden, British poet, performer and author

See also
 Selena (disambiguation)